Juliidae, common name the bivalved gastropods, is a family of minute sea snails, marine gastropod mollusks or micromollusks in the superfamily Oxynooidea, an opisthobranch group. 

These are sacoglossan (sap-sucking) sea snails, and many of them are green in color.

These snails are extremely unusual in that their shells consist of two separate hinged pieces or valves. The valves are joined by a ligament, and look nothing like a normal snail shell; instead the valves look almost exactly like the two hinged valves of a clam, a bivalve mollusk, which is a related but very different class of mollusks.

Up until the mid-20th century, the Juliidae were known only from fossil shells, and not surprisingly, these fossils were interpreted as being the shells of bivalves. Julia, which is the type genus of the family, was named in 1862 by Augustus Addison Gould, who described it as a bivalve genus. Juliidae are known from the Eocene period to the Recent, but they probably first appeared during the Paleocene.

Taxonomy as "bivalves" 
These bivalved gastropods were for a long time only known from fossils and dead material. Because of this, they had been described as being somewhat atypical bivalves. In the late 19th century they were classified among the bivalves, within the family Mytilidae, the mussels.

The similarity of the shells of Juliidae to those of bivalves does not  mean that these snails are closely related to bivalves; this is an example of convergent evolution.

Discovery of live animals 
Until the mid-20th century, these creatures were still considered to be bivalves. Then, in 1959, living individuals of one species were collected on the green alga, Caulerpa, in Japan. It was immediately clear that these animals were, in fact, unusual gastropods with a two-part shell. The first-discovered live species of bivalved gastropod was Tamanovalva limax, described by Kawaguti & Baba (1959).

Once the habitat, appearance, and life habits of these very small and inconspicuous animals were understood, researchers in subsequent years were able to find a number of other species and genera in different parts of the world, also living on various species of Caulerpa.

2005 taxonomy 
This family is within the superorder Sacoglossa (according to the taxonomy of the Gastropoda by Bouchet & Rocroi, 2005).

The family Juliidae consists of the following subfamilies (according to the taxonomy of the Gastropoda by Bouchet & Rocroi, 2005):
 subfamily Juliinae E. A. Smith, 1885 - synonym: Prasinidae Stoliczka, 1871
 subfamily Bertheliniinae Keen & A. G. Smith, 1961 - synonym: Tamanovalvidae Kawaguti & Baba, 1959
 † (fossil) subfamily Gougerotiinae Le Renard, 1980

Description 

As Tryon (1884) wrote in his description of the genus Julia: the shell is oblong, thick, and cordiform. The valves are closed, the margins entire and the valves are inequilateral. The lunule is deep circular, projecting into the interior of the right valve, the left valve is in the same place furnished with dentiform tubercles. The hinge line is simple and arched. The ligament is external and narrow. There are two muscle scars which are unequal and subcentral.

These animals have two valves, and the soft parts can be completely withdrawn inside the shell. The two valves are usually thin and translucent.

In the genus Tamanovalva there is a protoconch on the apex of the left valve. This is clearly visible in the left valve of Tamanovalva babai.

The body of the live animals is in most cases green (as it is in many sacoglossans), and in many species the individual appears green in totality. This, combined with the very small overall size, makes the animal hard to see on the green algae on which it lives. This ability serves as crypsis, especially as cryptic coloration (camouflage). In two species  and  the camouflage is even more complete: the mantle of the animal is patterned in a way that very closely resembles the structure of the alga on which it lives.

The empty valves of the shells of these animals are in some cases green, in other cases brownish-green or yellow, and in yet others, colorless. The species Julia zebra has shells that are finely striped with brown and blotched with white.

Ecology

Distribution 
Species in this family occur in all tropical zone seas and all temperate zone seas.

Life cycle 
After hatching, the juvenile snails immediately take their place on algae (the larval phase of veliger is extremely short).

Feeding habits 
Juliidae feed on green algae of the genus Caulerpa. Some species of Juliidae feed only on one species of Caulerpa; others feed on multiple species of this green alga.

Genera 
The type genus of the family Juliidae is Julia Gould, 1862.

Based on a classification by Jensen (1996), three recent genera were recognized in the family Juliidae: Julia Gould, 1862; Berthelinia Crosse, 1875; Tamanovalva Kawaguti & Baba, 1959.

While Jensen (2007) recognized two recent genera with a few subgenera in the genus Berthelinia. Recent species listed here are based on Jensen (2007), fossil genera and species are based on Le Renard (1996):

Juliinae 
 Julia Gould, 1862 - synonym: Prasina Deshayes, 1863
 (fossil) Candinia Le Renard J., Sabelli B. & Taviani M. 1996
 (fossil) Candinia pliocaenica Le Renard J., Sabelli B. & Taviani M. 1996 - from lower Pliocene near Siena in Italy.
 (fossil) Candinia krachi (Baluk & Jakubowski, 1968) - synonym: Berthelinia krachi Baluk & Jakubowski, 1968

Bertheliniinae 
 Berthelinia Crosse, 1875 - type genus of the subfamily Bertheliniinae

 subgenus Berthelinia Crosse, 1875
 (recent) Berthelinia caribbea Edmunds, 1963
 (recent) Berthelinia chloris (Dall, 1918)
 (invalid recent species) Berthelinia corallensis Hedley, 1920
 (recent) Berthelinia darwini Jensen, 1997
 (recent) Berthelinia ganapati Sarma, 1975
 (recent) Berthelinia pseudochloris Kay, 1964
 (recent) Berthelinia rottnesti Jensen, 1993
 (recent) Berthelinia schlumbergeri Dautzenberg, 1895
 (recent) Berthelinia waltairensis Sarma, 1975
 (fossil) Berthelinia elegans Crosse, 1875
 subgenus Midorigai : synonym of Berthelinia Crosse, 1875
 (recent) Berthelinia australis (Burn, 1960) - synonym: Midorigai australis Burn, 1960
 subgenus Tamanovalva Kawaguti & Baba, 1959 : synonym of Berthelinia Crosse, 1875
 (recent) Berthelinia babai (Burn, 1965) - synonym: Tamanovalva babai Burn, 1965
 (recent) Berthelinia fijiensis (Burn, 1966)
 (recent) Berthelinia limax (Kawaguti & Baba, 1959) - synonym: Tamanovalva limax Kawaguti & Baba, 1959 - a type species of the subgenus Tamanovalva
 subgenus Edenttellina : synonym of Berthelinia Crosse, 1875
 (recent) Berthelinia typica (Gatliff & Gabriel, 1911) - synonym: Edenttellina typica Gatliff & Gabriel, 1911
 (fossil?) Anomalomya Cossmann, 1887
 (fossil?) Namnetia Cossmann, 1906
 (fossil?) Squamulinia Le Renard, 1989

Gougerotiinae 
 (fossil) Gougerotia Le Renard, 1980 - type genus of the subfamily Gougerotiinae
 (fossil) Gougerotia orthodonta Le Renard, 1980

? subfamily
 (fossil) Hemiplicatula Deshayes, 1861
 (fossil?) Saintia de Raincourt, 1877

See also 
 Valve (mollusc)

References 
This article incorporates public domain text from reference.

External links 

 Cory Pittman & Pauline Fiene. 2009. Juliidae. Sea Slugs of Hawaii.
 Images of 4 species of Juliidae in Japan
 Photos of Julia exquisita at Sea Slug Forum
 Detailed photos of the shell of Julia exquisita at Sea Slug Forum
  http://taxonomist.symphonic-net.com/contents/Others/Julia/julia!.html

 
Extant Eocene first appearances